The Tyntynder Football Netball Club, nicknamed the Bulldogs, is an Australian rules football and netball club based in the Central Murray Football League. They won three premierships in a row from 1997–99, and also won the 2006 and 2007 Night Series (pre-season).

From 2004-06 the Under 15's won 3 premierships in a row. In 2002 and 2004 the Under 11's side won premierships. The under 11's side came third in 2005 and 2006 while the Under 13's were runner-up in 2005 and won the premiership in 2006. In 2018 the Under 14.5 team were runners-up, and in 2019 and 2022 they finished third, losing to Kerang and Lake Boga respectively.

Early history 
Tyntynder was formed in 1919. The club fielded a side in the Swan Hill Association in 1920 and 1921.
They reformed in 1929 and fielded a side in the reconstituted Swan Hill Association . With the inclusion of Kerang and Mystic Park the competition began the Northern Districts FL in 1933. Tyntynder won the premiership in 1935, 1936 and 1937. The club finished up because of the second world war in 1940.

In 1947 the club reformed and joined the Mid Murray Football League. This league was replaced by the Central Murray Football League in 1997.

Premierships

References

External links
 Facebook page
 Official Website 

Australian rules football clubs in Victoria (Australia)
Central Murray Football League
1920 establishments in Australia
Netball teams in Victoria (Australia)